The List of major U.S. Commands of World War II includes major military commands of the United States.  These are units above corps level.

Major armies Commands 
 Army Air Forces (USAAF): Formed 9 March 1942.
 Army Ground Forces (AGF): Formed 9 March 1942.
 Army Service Forces (ASF): Formed 9 March 1942 as Services of Supply (USASOS); renamed on 12 March 1943.

Theater commands 
 European Theater of Operations (ETO): Formed 8 June 1942.
 North African Theater of Operations (NATO): Formed 4 February 1943. Redesignated Mediterranean Theater of Operations (MTO) on 1 November 1944.
 Central Pacific Area (COMCENPAC):  Primary subordinate command of Pacific Ocean Areas, also commanded by Chester W. Nimitz through the war.
 North Pacific Area (COMNORPAC):  Formed in April 1942 as a subordinate command of Pacific Ocean Areas, commanded by Robert A. Theobald to January 1943, Thomas C. Kinkaid to October 1943, and Frank J. Fletcher through the end of the war.
 Pacific Ocean Areas (CINCPOA):  Formed in April 1942 as primarily Navy command in the Pacific, consisting of Central Pacific Area, South Pacific Area, and North Pacific Area.  Commanded by Chester W. Nimitz through the war.
 South Pacific Area (COMSOPAC):  Formed in April 1942 as a subordinate command of Pacific Ocean Areas, commanded by Robert L. Ghormley through October 1942, William Halsey, Jr. to June 1944, John H. Newton to March 1945, and Admiral William L. Calhoun to the end of the war.
 Southeast Pacific Area (COMSOEASPAC): Formed in April 1942. Never became an active theater of war. Commanded by Ernest King throughout the war.
 South West Pacific Area (COMSOWESPAC):  Formed on 30 March 1942.  Commanded by Douglas MacArthur throughout the war.
 China Burma India Theater (CBI): Formed 2 February 1944. Commanded by Joseph W. Stilwell. Split into  China Theater under Albert Coady Wedemeyer and India Burma Theater under Daniel I. Sultan on 24 October 1944.

Army groups 
 First United States Army Group
 Sixth United States Army Group
 Twelfth United States Army Group
 Fifteenth Army Group

Armies 
 First United States Army:  Existed prior to the war, shipped to England in October 1943.  Landed at Normandy and was in North-West Europe through the end of the war.  Commanded by Omar Bradley from October 1943 to August 1944.
 Second United States Army:  Remained in the United States through the war.
 Third United States Army:  Existed prior to the war, shipped to England in January 1944.  Shipped to France in July 1944 and remained in North-West Europe through the end of the war.  Commanded by George S. Patton from January 1944 to the end of the war.
 Fourth United States Army:  Remained in the United States.
 Fifth United States Army:  Activated in August 1943 at Algiers.  Landed at Salerno in September 1943 and remained in Italy through the war.  Commanded by Mark W. Clark to November 1944 and Lucian Truscott through the end of the war.
 Sixth United States Army
 Seventh United States Army
 Eighth United States Army
 Ninth United States Army
 Tenth United States Army
 Fifteenth United States Army

Fleets 
 Asiatic Fleet
 Atlantic Fleet
 Pacific Fleet
 Third Fleet
 Fourth Fleet
 Fifth Fleet
 Seventh Fleet
 Eighth Fleet
 Ninth Fleet
 Tenth Fleet
 Twelfth Fleet
 Sixteen Fleet

Seaboards 
 Alaska Sea Frontier
 Caribbean Sea Frontier
 Eastern Sea Frontier
 Gulf Sea Frontier
 Hawaiian Sea Frontier
 Moroccan Sea Frontier
 Northwest Sea Frontier
 Panama Sea Frontier
 Philippine Sea Frontier
 Western Sea Frontier

Naval Task Forces
 Task Force 38
 Task Force 58

Naval Forces 
 United States Naval Forces Europe
 Naval Forces France
 United States Naval Forces Germany
 Amphibious Force, Pacific Fleet (ComPhibPac)
 Amphibious Force North Pacific
 Amphibious Force South Pacific
 Amphibious Force South-West Pacific
 Amphibious Training Command
 III Amphibious Force
 V Amphibious Force
 VII Amphibious Force
 IX Amphibious Force
 XI Amphibious Force

Marine commands 
 Fleet Marine Force, Pacific (FMFPac)
 III Amphibious Corps (III AC)
 V Amphibious Corps (VAC)

Air Forces 
 First Air Force
 Second Air Force
 Third Air Force
 Fourth Air Force
 Fifth Air Force
 Sixth Air Force
 Seventh Air Force
 Eighth Air Force
 Ninth Air Force
 Tenth Air Force
 Eleventh Air Force
 Twelfth Air Force
 Thirteenth Air Force
 Fourteenth Air Force
 Fifteenth Air Force
 Twentieth Air Force
 Air Transport Command

See also

 

Commands
World War II
United States Commands
World War II Commands
Major commands